William or Billy Garland may refer to:

 William Garland (politician) (1856–1901), politician in Manitoba, Canada
 William Foster Garland (1875–1941), Ontario merchant and political figure
 William May Garland (1866–1948), real estate developer in Los Angeles
 Billy Garland (1918–1960), American blues musician
 Billy Garland, former Black Panther and biological father of Tupac Shakur